In military terms, 140th Division or 140th Infantry Division may refer to:

 140th Division (Imperial Japanese Army)
 140th Rifle Division (Soviet Union)